Matej Tomek (born 24 May 1997) is a Slovak professional ice hockey goaltender for HC Verva Litvínov of the Czech Extraliga (ELH).

Career
Tomek spent the 2016–2017 season with the North Dakota Fighting Hawks men's ice hockey team. During his time at the University of North Dakota, Tomek played a total of two games.
Tomek previously played for HK Dukla Trenčín of the Slovak Tipsport liga during the 2019–20 season.

On 18 January 2022, he was named to the roster to represent Slovakia at the 2022 Winter Olympics.

Career statistics

Regular season and playoffs

References

External links

 

1997 births
Living people
Slovak ice hockey goaltenders
Ice hockey people from Bratislava
Competitors at the 2019 Winter Universiade
Universiade medalists in ice hockey
Universiade silver medalists for Slovakia
HK Dukla Trenčín players
SaiPa players
KalPa players
HC Kometa Brno players
Ice hockey players at the 2022 Winter Olympics
Olympic ice hockey players of Slovakia
Medalists at the 2022 Winter Olympics
Olympic bronze medalists for Slovakia
Olympic medalists in ice hockey
Slovak expatriate ice hockey players in the United States
Slovak expatriate ice hockey players in Finland
Slovak expatriate ice hockey players in the Czech Republic